Ndai, also known as Galke or Pormi, is a nearly extinct Mbum language of northern Cameroon. There are only about a few speakers remaining in the vicinity of Tcholliré (Tcholliré commune, Mayo-Rey department, Northern Region).

References

Languages of Cameroon
Mbum languages